No Exit is the seventh studio album by American rock band Blondie, released on February 23, 1999, by Beyond Music. It was the band's first album in 17 years and features the UK number-one single "Maria". As of March 2006, the album had sold two million copies worldwide.

Overview
As was customary for a Blondie album, No Exit dabbled in many genres, including pop, reggae, country, and hip hop. Mike Chapman, who had produced all but the first two of Blondie's previous albums, produced some of the early demos for the album, though final production of the album fell to Craig Leon.

A cover of the Shangri-Las' 1965 song "Out in the Streets" was included on the album. It was originally recorded by the band in 1975 while they were trying to get a record deal. The demo version was first issued on EMI's 1994 anthology The Platinum Collection and was later included on the 2001 remastered version of the band's eponymous debut studio album.

A comeback promotional tour, the No Exit Tour, was launched preceding the release of the album, which spanned 13 months and visited Europe, North America and Oceania.

Release and reception
No Exit reached number three on the UK Albums Chart, and was certified gold by the British Phonographic Industry (BPI) for sales in excess of 100,000 copies. It was preceded by the single "Maria", which became Blondie's sixth UK number one, exactly 20 years after the band's first number one, "Heart of Glass", making them the first American band to have chart-topping UK singles in three different decades: 1970s, 1980s, and 1990s. A second single, "Nothing Is Real but the Girl", peaked at number 26 on the UK Singles Chart. The title track, "No Exit", was released as a limited-edition third single in Europe, and is a fusion of classical, hip hop and rock, and featured raps by Mobb Deep, Coolio, U-God, and Inspectah Deck.

The album was released in several editions in different countries with various bonus tracks, mainly live versions of songs recorded during the band's No Exit Tour. The album was also reissued in 2001 along with all of Blondie's other studio albums, this time including three bonus tracks.

Chris Stein commented on the title of the album in a 2004 interview: "The title was taken from a Sartre play, which says there's no madness in individuals, it's all in groups. I think that's probably what all these reality TV shows are about. Maybe we were a reality TV show before there was reality TV."

The album is not available on streaming platforms or digital music stores, most likely because of a possible dispute in licensing or distribution rights, although the song "Maria" from the album can still be found on these platforms and stores on compilation albums.

Track listing

Notes
 On the 2001 reissue, tracks 15 to 17 are sequenced as one track with a total duration of 17:51.

Personnel
Credits adapted from the liner notes of No Exit.

Blondie
 Clem Burke
 Jimmy Destri
 Deborah Harry
 Chris Stein

Additional musicians

 Leigh Foxx – bass guitar
 Paul Carbonara – guitar
 James Chance – saxophone
 Candy Dulfer – saxophone 
 Helen Hooke – violin
 Frank Pagano – percussion
 Dave Ironside – saxophone
 Robert Aaron – tenor saxophone, baritone saxophone, flute
 Rick Davies – trombone
 Ken Fradley – trumpet
 Rik Simpson – drum programming
 Coolio – vocals 
 Donna Destri – backing vocals
 Cassell Webb – backing vocals
 Jeffrey Lee Pierce – backing vocals
 Nancy West – backing vocals
 Theo Kogan – backing vocals
 Romy Ashby – backing vocals

Technical

 Craig Leon – production, recording ; mixing 
 Cassell Webb – production assistance
 Mike Shipley – mixing 
 Randy Nicklaus – mixing 
 Michael Tocci – engineering assistance
 John Wydrycs – engineering assistance
 Ian Blanch – engineering assistance
 Milton Chan – engineering assistance
 Tal Miller – engineering assistance
 John Tamburello – technical installation
 Michael Block – technical installation
 Steve Hall – mastering

Artwork
 Rob Roth – art direction, design, photography
 Jana Paterson – design

Charts

Weekly charts

Year-end charts

Certifications and sales

References

1999 albums
Albums produced by Craig Leon
Albums recorded at Electric Lady Studios
Beyond Records albums
Blondie (band) albums